Testis-specific Y-encoded protein 1 is a protein that in humans is encoded by the TSPY1 gene.

The protein encoded by this gene is found only in testicular tissue and may be involved in spermatogenesis. Approximately 35 copies of this gene are present in humans, but only a single, nonfunctional orthologous gene is found in mice. Two transcript variants encoding different isoforms have been found for this gene.  The protein is strongly overexpressed in gonadoblastoma.

See also
TSPYL1: TSPY1 like protein

References

Further reading